Heinz Walter Kozur (born 26 March 1942 in Hoyerswerda; died 20 December 2013 in Budapest) was a German paleontologist and stratigrapher.

In 1974, with Mock, he described the conodont genus Misikella, in 1975, with Merrill, the genus Diplognathodus, in 1977, the genus Vjalovognathus, in 1988, the genus Budurovignathus, in 1989, the genus Mesogondolella, in 1990, the genera Clarkina and Chiosella and in 2003, the genus Carnepigondolella.

In 2011, with RE Weems, he made additions to the uppermost Alaunian through Rhaetian (Triassic) conchostracan zonation of North America.

References 

 Kozur, Heinz & Merrill, G.K. 1975. Genus Diplognathodus. In : Kozur, H. Beiträge zur Conodontenfauna des Perm. Geologisch-Paläontologische Mitteilungen, Innsbruck, pages 9–10
 Menning, M.; Alekseev, A.S.; Chuvashov, B.I.; Davydov, V.I.; Devuyst, F.-X.; Forke, H.C.; Grunt, T.A.; Hance, L.; Heckel, P.H.; Izokh, N.G.; Jin, Y.-G.; Jones, P.J.; Kotlyar, G.V.; Kozur, H.W.; Nemyrovska, T.I.; Schneider, J.W.; Wang, X.-D.; Weddige, K.; Weyer, D. & Work, D.M.; 2006: Global time scale and regional stratigraphic reference scales of Central and West Europe, East Europe, Tethys, South China, and North America as used in the Devonian–Carboniferous–Permian Correlation Chart 2003 (DCP 2003), Palaeogeography, Palaeoclimatology, Palaeoecology 240(1-2): pp 318–372.
 Kozur, Heinz, & Helfried Mostler. 1996. Longobardian (Late Ladinian) Oertlispongidae (Radiolaria) from the Republic of Bosnia-Hercegovina [sic] and the Strategraphic Value of Advanced Oertlispongidae. Geologisch-Paläontologische Mitteilungen (Innsbruck) special volume 4: 105–193, p. 188.
 Kozur, Heinz & Krahl, J. (1987). Erster Nachweis von Radiolarien im tethyalen Perm Europas. N. Jb. Geol. Paläontol. Abh., 174, p. 357-372

German paleontologists
Conodont specialists
Stratigraphy
1942 births
2013 deaths